Édouard Armand (born August 1890, date of death unknown) was a Haitian sprinter. He competed in the men's 400 metres at the 1924 Summer Olympics.

References

External links
 

1890 births
Year of death missing
Athletes (track and field) at the 1924 Summer Olympics
Haitian male sprinters
Haitian male middle-distance runners
Haitian decathletes
Olympic athletes of Haiti
Place of birth missing
Olympic decathletes